Oto-hime or Otohime, in the Japanese folktale of Urashima Tarō, is the princess of the undersea palace Ryūgū-jō.

Second daughter 

Oto-hime (Princess Oto)'s name consists of the character also read otsu meaning "No. 2". Thus Oto-hime must have been the 'second daughter' or 'younger princess' of the Dragon King (Ryū-ō), as explained by folklorist  in his bilingual edition of the In Urashima fairytale. Miyao whimsically wonders whatever became of Kō-hime, the elder daughter never mentioned.

Explanatory notes

References 

Bibliography

External links

Female characters in fairy tales
Fictional princesses
Japanese folklore
Japanese fairy tales
Japanese legends